The Basilica of the Eternal Father Also Basilica of the Divine Eternal Father It is a Catholic church and sanctuary located in the city of Trindade in the state of Goiás, in Brazil, the only basilica in the world dedicated to the Divine Eternal Father.

Around 1848 was built the first chapel covered with Burití leaves. Later, a major chapel was built on the banks of the «Barro Preto». A third chapel was built in 1876. The first Shrine of the Divine Eternal Father was inaugurated in 1912. This first sanctuary is known as the ancient shrine, and is the parent of the Parish of the Trinity.

In 1943, Don Emanuel Gomes de Oliveira, archbishop of Goiás at the time, made it the cornerstone of the New Sanctuary. In 1955, despite all efforts, the work was not yet finished. In 1957, with the creation and installation of the Catholic archdiocese of Goiânia, Archbishop Fernando Gomes dos Santos, the first archbishop of this archdiocese, presented a project for the construction of the sanctuary. In 1974 it was possible to carry out the novena and the feast of the Divine Eternal Father on the site.

In 1994 began the reform and adaptation of the building in order to give it the dignity of being called "Sanctuary of the Divine Eternal Father". With the help of pilgrims and devotees, the temple was completely renovated.

In 2006 under the pontificate of Benedict XVI the church was declared Basilica.

See also
Roman Catholicism in Brazil
Eternal Father (disambiguation)
Parish Church of Trindade
Feast of the Eternal Father

References

Basilica churches in Brazil
Roman Catholic churches completed in 1974
Roman Catholic churches in Goiás
20th-century Roman Catholic church buildings in Brazil